The Chifeng sui, known in English as the Marrow of the Red Phoenix, is a Chinese medical compendium composed during the Ming dynasty by Zhou Lüjing. Born to an upper-class family, Zhou was groomed for politics; after being diagnosed with tuberculosis, however, he embarked on a quest for self-healing and eventually became a Daoist ascetic. Dated to 1578, the Chifeng sui contains numerous "longevity methods" collected by Zhou over the years.

Contents
Drawing upon sources on qigong from the Song and Yuan dynasties, the Chifeng sui is concerned with "longevity methods" including breathing techniques, gymnastics, and sleep exercises. The manual also includes twelve "incubation practices of stillness" attributed to the "master of cosmic energy" Chen Tuan.

Authorship and publication history
Although Zhou Lüjing was an educated and married aristocrat, he was also prone to sickness. After contracting tuberculosis, Zhou left his family in search of ways to improve his health. Over the years, Zhou became well-versed in Daoism and had amassed a vast collection of Daoist spells and medicine. Zhou, who was also known as "Meidian daoren" or the "Daoist Confounded by Plum Blossoms", subsequently composed the Chifeng sui, which is dated to 1578 and first appears in his anthology of medical writings titled Yimen guangdu or Wide Tablets of the Gate of Silence.

References

Citations

Bibliography

 
 
 
 
 
 

Chinese medical texts
Taoist texts
History of ancient medicine
Medical manuals